The Gallatin Commercial Historic District is the downtown square area of Gallatin, Sumner County, Tennessee. It was listed as a historic district on the National Register of Historic Places in 1985.  The  district included 66 contributing buildings and 22 non-contributing ones.

References

Sumner County Fact Book 2007-2008. The News Examiner & The Hendersonville Star News. 2007.

Geography of Sumner County, Tennessee
Historic districts on the National Register of Historic Places in Tennessee
National Register of Historic Places in Sumner County, Tennessee